Bent Jørgensen may refer to:

 Bent Jørgensen (handballer) (born 1945), Danish handball player
 Bent Jørgensen (cyclist) (born 1923), Danish cyclist
 Bent Jørgensen (statistician) (1954–2015), Danish statistician